Nima Aziminejad, (born 15 September 1978) is an Iranian composer, setar player and sound engineer.

Biography
Nima Aziminejad is the son of Jamshid Aziminejad and has been an active figure in the field of satirizing, writing and directing. His TV series Khaneye Aroosakha (House of Puppets) was a highly popular children’s show.
Nima started learning music from his father and his brother by playing setar at the age of eight.
Later on, he attended classes held by masters such as Farhad Fakhreddini, Mohammad-Reza Lotfi, Pashang Kamkar and Keyvan Mirhadi.

At the age of nineteen he began his activities in theatre. He played instruments in Azita Hajian's theatre group Green. After a while he started composing music as an individual composer for theatre and also he had activities in TV such as composing, recording supervisor and music consultant of the “pooya” channel.

Meanwhile, he improved his skill in sound recording learning from Raymond Movsessian and Mohammad Fallahi and received his degree in sound engineering from Fanni va Herfeii Institute.

In 2005 he founded the Arattah ensemble with his friends and there he played his Iranian compositions for the first time. He also learned singing and singing techniques from masters Abdolkarim Paksirat and Mario Taghadossi.

Currently he is active in the Laklak ensemble, composing, playing mainly setar, participating in different music festivals and holding concerts.

Composing

Theatre music composer
The Door (Dar) theatre directed by Ali Rahimi (The music is chosen among the top three compositions of the Iranian Association of Theatre Critics in 2004)
The Rope (Tanab) theatre directed by Ali Rahimi
The Doll (Aroosak) directed by ali rahimi (it won first place in the Children's Musical Theatre Festival in 2006)
Who Nobody Knew Him (Kasi ke hichkas nemidanest kist) theatre directed by Daryush Faezi
1 woman, 1 man (Yek zan, Yek mard) theatre directed by Azita Hajian and music co-composed with Amir Tavassoli (candidate at the Fajr Theater Festival)
To Set Goodnight Your Highness Count and Fall Melody (Tanzime shabbekheir jenabe kont va melodye paeezi) theatre directed by Michael Shahrestani
The Red Cheek (Lop Goli) directed by the Fitileh group for children

Composing for TV movies
Niloofar directed by Alireza Akhlaghi production of Mahed movie company
The Searchers (Kavoshgaran) directed by Hamidreza Naderi

Composing for TV series
Shaee, dancing documentary series on the Kurdsat Channel directed by Kaveh Moeinfar
Adventurous Villa (Vilaye por majara) directed by Mohammadreza Naderi
Wrath and Peace (Ghahr o ashti) directed by Ahmad Ramezan Zadeh production of Jozan Film company
Fitileh songs named “The Sun”, “The Summer”, “The Autumn” and “Mouse series”.

Composing for video-arts
Motra directed by Farideh Shahsavarani
The dream of colour (Royaye Rang) directed by Farideh Shahsavarani
Ashoura directed by Farideh Shahsavarani
The Birth (Tavalod) directed by Farideh Shahsavarani
The Stone Caravansary (Karavansaraye Sangi) directed by Siamak Nasiri Ziba
Cinema’s Deceased of Last Year in the opening ceremony of the Fajr Film Festival directed by Masoud Amini
Closing  ceremony of the Youth Festival
Multimedia CD for Kanoun Parvaresh Fekri (Intellectual Development Community) directed by Sianoush Nasiri Ziba

Composing for animation
AIDS Child (Motevalede AIDS) directed by Neda Shidvash
Mouse and Snake (Mosh O Mar) directed by Sianoush Nasiri Ziba

Supervisor recorder of movies
Spy (Nofuzi) directed by Ahmad Kaveri and Mehdi Fiuzi
Beyond the River (Ansooye roodkhane) directed by Abbas Ahmadi Motlagh
Gold and Copper (Tala va Mes) directed by Homayoun Asadian

Supervisor recorder of TV series
The Redeemed (Rastegaran) directed by Sirous Moghadam and composed by Arya Aziminejad
After Years (Pas az Salha) directed by Akbar Khajouei and composed by Arya Aziminejad
Day of Regret (Rooze Hasrat) directed by Sirous Moghadam and composed by Arya Aziminejad
Home (Chardivari) directed by Sirous Moghadam and composed by Arya Aziminejad
Below Eight (Zire Hasht) directed by Sirous Moghadam and composed by Arya Aziminejad
Ghazal track sung by Mohammad Esfahani and composed by Arya Aziminejad

Playing instruments in theatre plays
Over the Mirror (Ansoye Ayeneh) directed by Azita Hajian
The Wolf and The Ewe (Gorg O Mish) directed by Azita Hajian
Each Flower has Odour directed by Ali Sadoughi
Bitter Play of Life (() directed by Shohreh Lorestani
Azhdahak directed by Vahid Eyvazi
Three years and a half (() directed by Amir Aghaei

As player of different musical instruments in series
Setar player in After Years (Pas az salha)
Bass setar player in Day of Regret (Roze Hasrat)

Experiences in sound recording

Sound recording

Shining Sun (Aftabe aalam tab) studio
Concert of Masters Mohammad-Reza Shajarian, Hossein Alizadeh, Kayhan Kalhor and Homayoun Shajarian (with Raymond Movsessian)
Concert of Kamkars ensemble (with Raymond Movsessian)
Concert of master Mohammad-Reza Shajarian, Majid Derakhshani, Hossein Behroozinia, Saeid Farajpouri (with Raymond Movsessian)
Orchestra of Ebrahim Esbati in Kanoun Parvaresh Fekri (Intellectual Development Community) 

Concert of Saeid Kordmafi in Tehran University
Concert of Meghdad Shah Hosseini
Concert of Inak ensemble in Arya Aziminejad’s  music school

Sound recording of music albums
Merry (Saghi Sarmast) production of Sound of Barbad company
Improvise (Bedahe Sazi) production of Mahoor Institute of culture and art

References 

http://www.bbc.co.uk/persian/arts/021115_sh-fs46.shtml
http://www.musicema.com/node/161834
http://aryafans.ir/
https://www.youtube.com/watch?v=V7u36MDmAlk

Living people
1951 births
Iranian composers
Iranian setar players
People from Tehran